= American Industries =

- Company type: S.A. (corporation)
- Industry: Industrial construction
- Founded: 1977
- Founder: Luis Lara
- Headquarters: Chihuahua, Chihuahua, México
- Key people: Luis Lara, Chairman of the board
- Revenue: $100 million USD (2006)
- Number of employees: 200

American Industries is a large real estate development company based in Chihuahua, Mexico. They also have offices in Monterrey, Ciudad Juárez, and El Paso.

It provides various industrial real estate services, including built-to-suit, sale-lease-back, shared leases programs, and warehousing.
